Larry or Laurence Crane may refer to:

 Larry Crane (recording engineer), American editor, recording engineer and archivist
 Larry Crane (guitarist) (born 1956), American rock musician and songwriter
Laurence Crane (born 1961), English composer of contemporary classical music